Thomas Ridout may refer to:

 Thomas Ridout (architect) (1828–1905), Canadian architect and railway engineer
 Thomas Ridout (politician) (1754–1829), Canadian politician
 Thomas Gibbs Ridout (1792–1861), Canadian banker